The S4C Authority is an independent public body appointed by the United Kingdom Government's Secretary of State for Digital, Culture, Media and Sport to oversee the management of the Welsh-language television channel S4C. Although an independent body, the authority works in conjunction with the UK-wide broadcasting and telecommunications regulator Ofcom, who have responsibility for regulating S4C's output.

The current members of the S4C Authority are Bill Davies, John Davies, Cenwyn Edwards, Dyfrig Jones, Glenda Jones, Huw Jones (Chair), Winston Roddick, and Rheon Thomas (Vice Chair).

In the spending review which he presented to the House of Commons on 20 October 2010, the Chancellor of the Exchequer, George Osborne, announced that part of the responsibility for funding S4C was to be transferred to the BBC. On 10 August 2012, the BBC Trust, Ofcom and the S4C Authority launched a public consultation on a draft Operating Agreement concluded between the two broadcasters and setting out their relationship from 1 April 2013, the date following which it is intended that the majority of S4C's funding will come from the BBC licence fee.

References

Public bodies and task forces of the United Kingdom government
BBC
Statutory corporations of the United Kingdom government
Companies established in 1981
1981 establishments in the United Kingdom